Agata Bulwa (born 4 September 1975) is a Polish archer. She competed in the women's individual and team events at the 2000 Summer Olympics.

References

External links
 

1975 births
Living people
Polish female archers
Olympic archers of Poland
Archers at the 2000 Summer Olympics
People from Dąbrowa Tarnowska